Raoul III may refer to:

 Ralph III of Valois († 1038)
 Raoul III of Tosny († c. 1126)
 Raoul III de Nesle († 1235)